Elizabeth Kemp (November 5, 1951 – September 1, 2017) was an American actress and acting coach.

She began her career on the television series Love of Life in 1973, after studying at the American Academy of Dramatic Arts and the Actors Studio under Lee Strasberg. She went on to become an acting coach and faculty member of the Actors Studio Drama School at Pace University.

Early life
Kemp was born in Key West, Florida, the daughter of Nancy Jean (Haycock) and Joseph Clifton Kemp, a business executive and U.S. Navy officer and test pilot stationed at the Pentagon.

Kemp showed talent as a child painter from age 13–16, and graduated from high school with a special award for creative achievement. At 16 she applied to the Rhode Island School of Design, but was told to wait a year. She instead went to New York City and studied at The Art Students League and American Academy of Dramatic Arts, but dropped out shortly afterward.

Career
Kemp was in the original cast of The Best Little Whorehouse in Texas, which began at the off-Broadway The Actors Studio before moving to Broadway, where it became a long-running hit. Her mentor, Elia Kazan, took Tennessee Williams to see Kemp in the show, when Williams was looking for an actress to play Baby Doll in the world premiere of one of his last plays, Tiger Tail. After the performance, Williams gave her the part, and she worked closely with him in developing the role. In 1978, she appeared on Broadway in a minor part in Once in a Lifetime.

In 1980, Kemp made her feature film debut in the horror film He Knows You're Alone, opposite Caitlin O'Heaney and Tom Hanks. She received the GLAAD Award for her work on L.A. Law (1986). As a director, Kemp was responsible for many productions at The Actors Studio including The Glass Menagerie, The Beauty Queen of Leenane, and the world premier of Edward Allan Baker's Free Gift Inside. Internationally, Kemp directed The Stronger and Homesick at Strindbergs Original Intima Theater in Stockholm, and Dreamstories at The Claude LeLouche Theatre Cine 13 in Paris and La Spazia Teatro in Rome. She became a Lifetime Member of The Actors Studio in 1975.

After appearing on several television series, including L.A. Law, in the mid-1990s, Kemp left Los Angeles and returned to New York City, where she worked odd jobs, including waiting tables at a restaurant. Soon after, she began teaching acting at the Strasberg Institute, then became a member of the Acting Faculty—and later, chair— of The Actors Studio Drama School at Pace University.

At the Actors Studio Drama School, Kemp was a mentor to student actors like Bradley Cooper and Poorna Jagannathan. She worked across the country at The California Actors Theatre in San Francisco, Alliance Theatre in Atlanta, Folger Theatre in Washington, D.C., Center Stage in Baltimore and Walnut Street Theatre in Philadelphia. She was also an artistic associate and tutor at 16th Street Actors Studio in Melbourne, Australia.

Personal life
Kemp married actor Michael Margotta in New York City in 1984. They separated in June 1991 and later divorced.

Death
Kemp died of cancer on September 1, 2017, in Venice, Los Angeles, at age 65. She received several public tributes from former students Bradley Cooper, Hugh Jackman and Lady Gaga. The 2018 film A Star Is Born is dedicated to her memory.

Filmography

Film

Television

Notes

References

External links

1951 births
2017 deaths
People from Key West, Florida
20th-century American actresses
21st-century American actresses
American acting coaches
Actresses from Florida
American Academy of Dramatic Arts alumni
American film actresses
American stage actresses
American television actresses
Deaths from cancer in California
Pace University faculty
American women academics